In telecommunications, a pilot signal is a signal, usually a single frequency, transmitted over a communications system for supervisory, control, equalization, continuity, synchronization, or reference purposes.

Uses in different communication systems

FM Radio 
 In FM stereo broadcasting, a pilot tone of 19 kHz indicates that there is stereophonic information at 38 kHz (the second harmonic of the pilot tone).  The receiver doubles the frequency of the pilot tone and uses it as a frequency and phase reference to demodulate the stereo information.

If no 19 kHz pilot tone is present, then any signals in the 23–53 kHz range are ignored by a stereo receiver. A guard band of ±4 kHz (15–23 kHz) protects the pilot tone from interference from the baseband audio signal (50 Hz–15 kHz) and from the lower sideband of the double sideband stereo information (23–53 kHz).  The third harmonic of the pilot (57 kHz) is used for Radio Data System. The fourth harmonic (76 kHz) is used for Data Radio Channel

AM Radio 
In AM stereo, the bandwidth is too narrow to accommodate subcarriers, so the modulation itself is changed, and the pilot tone is infrasonic (below the normal hearing range, instead of above it) at a frequency of 25 Hz.

Television 
In some color television standards, the color burst placed after every sync pulse on visible lines (as done in PAL and NTSC) is the pilot signal to indicate that there are color subcarriers present and allow synchronizing the phase of the local oscillator in the demodulation circuitry. However, SECAM features continuous subcarriers which don't need their phase tracked due to being frequency-modulated as compared to the QAM approach of the other systems, thus making it unnecessary.

In the NTSC television system, a pilot tone of  MHz (15,734.27 Hz) is used to indicate the presence of MTS stereo.

Video Recording 
In some analog video formats frequency modulation is the standard method for recording the luminance part of the signal, and is used to record a composite video signal in direct color systems, e.g. Video 2000 and some Hi-band formats a pilot tone is added to the signal to detect and correct timebase errors.

Cable 
In cable service plant infrastructures, two or more pilot frequencies are used to allow network amplifiers to automatically adjust their gain over temperature swings. This is done by the amplifiers having special circuitry that track the frequencies in order to maintain a consistent gain. Without this capability, network amplifiers may drive the signal too strongly or weakly, thus requiring constant adjustment. Pilot frequencies can be generated by an agile modulator, taking the space of analog NTSC channels, or by dedicated equipment.  Sometimes it is necessary to employ several independent pilot frequencies. Most radio relay systems use radio or continuity pilots of their own but transmit also the pilot frequencies belonging to the carrier frequency multiplex system.

See also 
Syncword
Synchronous Idle
Pilottone

References

Telecommunications techniques
Synchronization